Mitchell S. Goldberg (born 1959) is a United States district judge of the United States District Court for the Eastern District of Pennsylvania.

Education and career

Born in Philadelphia, Pennsylvania, Goldberg received an Artium Baccalaureus degree from Ithaca College in 1981 and a Juris Doctor from Temple University Beasley School of Law in 1986. After serving as an assistant district attorney in the Philadelphia District Attorney's Office from 1986 to 1989, he entered private practice in Pennsylvania until 1996. He became an Assistant United States Attorney in the Eastern District of Pennsylvania in 1997, serving in that position until 2003 when he was elected to a judgeship on the Bucks County Court of Common Pleas. He also taught as an adjunct professor at Temple University Beasley School of Law from 2002 to 2006.

Federal judicial service

On July 24, 2008, Goldberg was nominated by President George W. Bush to a seat on the United States District Court for the Eastern District of Pennsylvania vacated by John R. Padova. Goldberg was confirmed by the United States Senate on September 26, 2008, and received his commission on October 31, 2008.

See also
 List of Jewish American jurists

Sources

1959 births
Living people
Assistant United States Attorneys
Ithaca College alumni
Judges of the United States District Court for the Eastern District of Pennsylvania
Lawyers from Philadelphia
Temple University Beasley School of Law alumni
United States district court judges appointed by George W. Bush
21st-century American judges